The Forte VD.01(often called Danuvia VD-01) is a pistol manufactured, for a short time, by Danuvia Engineering Industries from 1990. In 1998, the rights to manufacture were sold to Intermodul Weapon Shops. The gun has gained some international attention as an oddity due to its unorthodox appearance and helical magazine.

Some prototypes of a machine pistol version were built.

References

Picture
Hungarian Weapons - Danuvia Pistols 

Machine pistols
Submachine guns
Weapons of Hungary
Semi-automatic pistols of Hungary
9mm Parabellum firearms